Elizabeth Jane Arnot (born 1 March 1996) is a Scottish professional footballer who plays as a forward for Rangers in the Scottish Women's Premier League and the Scotland national team. She has previously played for Manchester United, Hibernian and Hutchison Vale.

Club career

Hibernian
Arnot started her career at Edinburgh City and later Hutchison Vale before she joined Hibernian in January 2012. Arnot was part of the side that won consecutive Scottish domestic cup doubles in 2016 and 2017, and also finished as league runners-up on four occasions between 2013 and 2017.

In 2017, Arnot suffered a cruciate ligament injury, ruling her out for 14 months; on her return, she scored five goals for Hibernian in a 9–0 win against Celtic in the 2018 SWPL Cup final, retaining the title for the third straight year.

Manchester United 
On 27 June 2018, it was announced that Arnot and teammate Kirsty Smith were leaving Hibernian. Both players joined the newly formed Manchester United for the 2018–19 season. Arnot became the women's team's first goalscorer, scoring the only goal in the side's first competitive match, a 1–0 win against Liverpool in the FA Women's League Cup on 19 August. A month later, she scored her first league goal of the campaign in a 3–0 home win against Sheffield United. On 18 November 2018, Arnot scored her first United brace in a 0–5 win away to Crystal Palace.

Arnot scored her first goal of the 2019–20 season in an 11–1 League Cup home win against Leicester City on 21 November 2019. She left following the expiration of her contract at the end of her second season.

Rangers 
On 31 July 2020, Arnot returned to Scotland to sign with Rangers. She scored 16 goals in 21 appearances as she won the 2020–21 golden boot. During the 2021–22 season, Arnot contributed 25 goals and 23 assists in 31 appearances as Rangers won the Scottish Women's Premier League for the first time, confirming the title in a 0–0 draw at home to Glasgow City. Arnot made her 50th appearance for Rangers in a 4–0 victory over Aberdeen at Ibrox Stadium, scoring the fourth goal. On 27 April 2022, Arnot was nominated for the PFA Women's Player of the Year award and was named in the PFA Scotland Team of the Year. On 28 May 2022, she signed a two-year contract extension. 

In the inaugural match of the Women's Glasgow Cup, Rangers played Celtic on 24 July 2022 at Excelsior Stadium in Airdrie; Rangers lifted the trophy in a 2–1 victory. Arnot's corner was turned into goal by Celtic captain Kelly Clark for the second goal.  

During her time at Rangers, Arnot has appeared on BBC Television Centre Football Focus (Season 22 Episode 9) to discuss Scottish Women's football after the 2022 Women's Euro Championship.

International career

Arnot represented Scotland at Scotland under-17 and Scotland under-19 level. She made her full international debut for Scotland against Norway on 17 September 2015, when she came on as a substitute for Joanne Love. After a year out due to a cruciate ligament injury, which caused her to miss Euro 2017, Arnot was recalled to the Scotland squad in May 2018 for their World Cup qualifiers against Belarus and Poland. Arnot scored her first international goals during the 2019 Algarve Cup, scoring twice in a 4–1 win against Iceland.

In May 2019, Arnot was named in the Scotland squad for the 2019 FIFA Women's World Cup, the nation's first ever appearance at the tournament.

Career statistics

International goals
As of match played 10 June 2021. Scotland score listed first, score column indicates score after each Arnot goal.

Honours

Club 
Hibernian
 Scottish Women's Cup: 2016, 2017
 Scottish Women's Premier League Cup: 2016, 2017, 2018

Manchester United
 FA Women's Championship: 2018–19

Rangers
 Scottish Women's Premier League: 2021–22
 Scottish Women's Premier League Cup: 2022
 City of Glasgow Woman's Cup: 2022

Individual 
Scottish Women's Premier League golden boot: 2020–21
SWPL Player of the Month: December 2020
PFA Women's Player of the Year: 2022 (nominated)
PFA Scotland Team of the Year: 2022

References

External links 
 Profile at the Manchester United F.C. website
 
 
 

1996 births
Living people
Scottish women's footballers
Footballers from Edinburgh
Scotland women's international footballers
Hibernian W.F.C. players
Manchester United W.F.C. players
Rangers W.F.C. players
Women's Super League players
Scottish Women's Premier League players
Women's association football forwards
2019 FIFA Women's World Cup players